I17 may also refer to:
 Interstate 17, an Interstate Highway located entirely within the state of Arizona, United States
 Japanese submarine I-17, a B1 type submarine of the Imperial Japanese Navy
 Polikarpov I-17, a Soviet single-seat fighter prototype
 Bohuslän Regiment (I 17), a Swedish Army regiment